Richard Montesquieu Bellew (12 February 1803 – 8 January 1880) was an Irish politician.
He was educated at Trinity College, Dublin.
He took office as a Junior Lord of the Treasury in Lord John Russell's first government on the death of Denis O'Conor.

References

External links 

1803 births
1880 deaths
Members of the Parliament of the United Kingdom for County Louth constituencies (1801–1922)
UK MPs 1832–1835
UK MPs 1835–1837
UK MPs 1837–1841
UK MPs 1841–1847
UK MPs 1847–1852
UK MPs 1859–1865
Irish Repeal Association MPs